Still Live may refer to:
 Still Live (The Clarks album), 2006
 Still Live (Keith Jarrett album), 1986